Precious Blood Catholic Church may refer to:

Church of the Most Precious Blood, Manhattan
Most Precious Blood Roman Catholic Church, Rectory and Parochial School
Precious Blood Catholic Church (Chickasaw, Ohio)
Precious Blood Catholic Church (Los Angeles)
Precious Blood Roman Catholic Church (Winnipeg)